Mägipe is a village in Hiiumaa Parish, Hiiu County in northwestern Estonia.

The Kõpu Lighthouse is located in Mägipe.

References

 

Villages in Hiiu County